Terence D. Macaig (born October 23, 1938) is an American politician in the state of Vermont. He is a member of the Vermont House of Representatives, sitting as a Democrat from the Chittenden-2 district, having been first elected in 2008.

References

1938 births
Living people
People from Williston, Vermont
University of Vermont alumni
Democratic Party members of the Vermont House of Representatives
21st-century American politicians